The commune of Nyarusange is a commune of Gitega Province in central Burundi. The capital lies at Nyanrusange.

References

Communes of Burundi
Gitega Province